Dugandan Range is a mountain range in the Scenic Rim Region, Queensland, Australia.

Geography 
The range passes through the following localities (from north to south):

 Wyaralong, commencing south of Lake Wyalong and forming part of the locality's south-western boundary 
Bromelton, forming its western boundary
Coulson forming part of its south-eastern boundary
Allandale, passing through from the north-east to the south-east where the range has its midpoint
Milford, roughly forming its south-eastern boundary
Bunburra, forming part of its south-eastern boundary
Cannon Creek, forming its western boundary
Coochin, forming part of its eastern boundary
Maroon, forming a small part of the north-western boundary where it terminates

References 

Mountain ranges of Queensland
Scenic Rim Region